Johannes Hendrikus Jacob van den Berg (born 22 March 1946), better known as his stage name Harry Vanda, is a Dutch Australian musician, songwriter and record producer. He is best known as lead guitarist of the 1960s Australian rock band the Easybeats who with fellow member George Young formed the 1970s and 1980s songwriting and record production duo Vanda & Young.

Early life
Vanda's family migrated to Australia from the Netherlands in 1963, and settled in Sydney. In the same year he met rhythm guitarist George Young at the Villawood migrant hostel. In 2007, Australian Musician magazine selected this meeting as the most significant event in Australian pop and rock music history. Vanda, who had been a guitarist with the Hague-based band the Starfighters, came to fame in 1964–65 as the lead guitarist of the Easybeats.

Career
In 1966, both Vanda and Young penned many of the Easybeats' later recordings, including their major international hit, "Friday On My Mind".

After the Easybeats disbanded in 1970, Vanda & Young remained in the UK and continued their writing and performing partnership.

In 1973, Vanda and Young returned to Australia and took over as the house producers for leading independent record production company, Albert Productions, and publisher J. Albert & Son. From 1974 onwards they enjoyed huge success in Australia and internationally, writing and producing hits for a number of popular Australian groups and solo singers, including John Paul Young, Cheetah, Stevie Wright, Ted Mulry, Rose Tattoo, the Angels, William Shakespeare, Mark Williams and, most notably, AC/DC. AC/DC included George Young's brothers, guitarists Angus and Malcolm Young. Vanda & Young produced landmark albums such as Let There Be Rock, Powerage, If You Want Blood You've Got It, Dirty Deeds Done Dirt Cheap, High Voltage/TNT, amongst others. 

Vanda and Young also had major international success with their own studio-only project Flash and the Pan, achieving many hits round the world over a 15-year period, particularly in Europe where they had many chart topping records. Grace Jones had a hit with a cover of the Flash and the Pan song "Walking in the Rain".

In 1988 Vanda was inducted, along with George Young, into the inaugural class of the ARIA Hall of Fame.

By the late 1990s, Vanda and Young had left their longtime partnership with Albert Productions, and retired from the music industry. However, in 2005, Harry Vanda started Flashpoint Music in Surry Hills with his producer/engineer son, Daniel Vandenberg, setting up one of Australia's premier private studios. The studio has produced bands such as the Wrights and British India.

Instruments 
Vanda used a 1964 Höfner Verithin 1574 with Bigsby tremolo and 511 pickups, before switching in 1965 to a Gibson 345. In the Easybeats, Vanda also often played a cherry-red Maton 12-string electric guitar, which he donated to the collection of Powerhouse Museum in Sydney in 1999.  In addition, Vanda owned the red Gretsch Jet Firebird double cutaway guitar that was given to George Young's younger brother Malcolm. This guitar, nicknamed "The Beast", saw numerous modifications and was Malcolm Young's primary guitar throughout his career with AC/DC.

Honours 
In 1988 he was inducted, along with George Young, into the inaugural class of the ARIA Hall of Fame.

Since 2009, Albert Music and APRA AMCOS have held the Vanda & Young Global Songwriting Competition, named after the musicians.

Selected list of songs written by Vanda and Young
"Friday On My Mind" - The Easybeats, David Bowie, London, Gary Moore (1987), Richard Thompson
"Good Times" - The Easybeats, INXS & Jimmy Barnes (1986)
"Evie, Parts 1, 2 & 3" - Stevie Wright (1974), Pat Travers Band (1978), the Wrights (2004), Suzi Quatro
"Hard Road" - Stevie Wright, Rod Stewart
"Black Eyed Bruiser" - Stevie Wright (1975), Rose Tattoo (2007)
"Love is in the Air" - John Paul Young (1978)/(1992)
"Standing in the Rain" - John Paul Young (1976)
"I Hate the Music" - John Paul Young (1976)
"Yesterday's Hero" - John Paul Young (1975), Bay City Rollers (1976)
"Down Among the Dead Men" - Flash and the Pan (1978)
"Hey St Peter" - Flash and the Pan (1976)
"Walking in the Rain" - Flash and the Pan, Grace Jones
"Waiting for a Train" - Flash and the Pan
"Midnight Man" - Flash and the Pan
"Runnin' for the Red Light (I Gotta Life)" - Meat Loaf
"Show No Mercy" - Mark Williams (1990)

References

Further reading
 John Tait.  Vanda & Young. Inside Australia's Hit Factory.Published by University NSW Press Ltd. Australia, 2010..

External links
 Albert Music: Easybeats Facts

1946 births
Living people
20th-century Australian musicians
ARIA Hall of Fame inductees
APRA Award winners
ARIA Award winners
Australian rock guitarists
Australian record producers
Australian songwriters
Musicians from South Holland
Dutch emigrants to Australia
Naturalised citizens of Australia
Australian rock musicians
Lead guitarists
Musicians from Sydney
The Easybeats members
The Wrights (Australian band) members
Flash and the Pan members
Marcus Hook Roll Band members